The music of Laos includes the music of the Lao people, a Tai ethnic group, and other ethnic groups living in Laos. The traditional music of Laos has similarities with the traditional music of Thailand and Cambodia, including the names of the instruments and influences and developments. To categorize Lao music, it seems helpful to distinguish between the nonclassical folk traditions (which are presented through the ensembles and instruments used within), the classical music traditions and its basic ensembles, and vocal traditions.

The most popular form of music in Laos is the indigenous mor lam.

Classical music 
The Lao term ເພງລາວເດີມ "peng Lao deum" (traditional Lao songs) describes the royal court music of Laos. Historical records indicate that an indigenous classical tradition existed, which was mainly influenced by ancient Khmer traditions and mountainous ethnic groups. King Fa Ngum was raised and educated in Angkor Wat, so the Khmer traditions were the first center for the court music, which changed in 1828 when the Siamese sacked Vientiane and slowly infiltrated the musical traditions of the court as well.

Today, the court music has mostly vanished. It was considered as "elitist, bourgeoisie" and forbidden by the communist government, and the last performers in Tennessee, USA tried to rebuild the court music in diaspora but failed due to a lack of members. The classical ensemble and its instruments still get used in many Lao traditions today, are only used for the "lam" traditions and the only "theater" like traditions "li-ke" (or "lam poem", from 1940) which immigrated from northern Siam, gets performed with acting, storytelling in "lam" singing styles and a Khene mouth organ, thus remaining the only theater tradition in Laos today.

Mor lam 
Laotian mor lam (also spelled maw lam), though usually called simply lam in Laos is considered purer and more traditional than the forms found in Thailand. It often features the khaen (bamboo and reed mouth organ) and jousting pairs of singers, backed by colorful troupes, who improvise stories and courting duels. The material is often topical, colloquial, sexual and bawdy and is tolerated by the government even when sometimes it is the object of some of the jokes.
Ensembles typically include two singers (mor lam, the same term referring to the genre of music)— one male and one female—, a khene player (mor khaen), and other instruments including fiddles, flutes and bells.  Music varies widely across Laos, with the lam saravane style being most popular, while the city of Luang Prabang is known for a slow form called khaplam wai.  An extremely popular form developed in Thailand is called mor lam sing, and is faster and electrified.

Regional music of Laos 

Each of these traditions is influenced by regional playing styles, which can be separated in three different areas: Luang Prabang in the north, Vientiane in the center, and Champassak in the south.

Luang Prabang 
In Luang Prabang, classical Lao court music developed to high estate and vanished. Unfortunately, most of the instruments are collecting dust in the royal museum, but showpieces like bronze drums of the Dong Son age show the influence of ethnic minorities which were often from the mountainous areas.

Vientiane 
In Vientiane, the actual regional style shows Thai influences. The governmental school "Natasin" which was closed 1975 was reopened 1990 and educates and provides some ensembles for festivals, marriages and other purposes.

Champasak 
The southern region of Champassak is not only influenced by Khmer traditions, but is typically a mixture of Khmer, Thai and indigenous Lao traditions.

Popular music 
In the 1960s, Thai lam nu and lam ploen contributed to the development of lam luang, which is a form of song (and dance) which often has narrative lyrics.

Instruments 
 The most distinctive Lao musical instrument is a bamboo mouth organ called a khene.  The instrument was supposedly invented by a woman trying to imitate the calls of the garawek bird.  The woman took the new instrument to her king, and he told her it was fair, but that he wanted more.  She modified the instrument and he replied "Tia nee khaen dee" (this time it was better).

References

 Clewley, John. "Beyond Our Khaen". 2000.  In Broughton, Simon and Ellingham, Mark with McConnachie, James and Duane, Orla (Ed.), World Music, Vol. 2: Latin & North America, Caribbean, India, Asia and Pacific, pp 170–174. Rough Guides Ltd, Penguin Books. .

External links
 
  Audio clips: Traditional music of Laos. Musée d'ethnographie de Genève. Accessed November 25, 2010.
 The traditional music of Laos
 Alexandra Bounxouei music and videos
 www.laomusic.la
 www.laomall.com/artists
 Archives of Traditional Music in Laos
 Plain of Jars website

Laotian culture